Havre is the county seat and largest city in Hill County, Montana, United States. Havre is nicknamed the crown jewel of the Hi-Line. It is said to be named after the city of Le Havre in France. As of the 2020 census the population was 9,362.

History
Havre was incorporated in north-central Montana on 5 September 1893. In August 1893, twenty-six people voted to incorporate Havre as a city on September 5 of that year. The townsite was platted south of the railroad tracks on parts of Descelles’ and Simon Pepin’s ranches.  Like many railroad towns, Havre’s streets were set in a grid formation, with the east–west orientation of the railroad serving as the northern boundary of the town running parallel to the south by Main Street, which fronted the railroad tracks, followed by First through Third Streets. The avenues ran perpendicular to the tracks with Third Avenue running south from the Great Northern depot. The depot served as the gateway to the commercial district of Havre. First Street between Second Avenue and Fourth Avenue served as the main commercial street, and Third Avenue became the main avenue. The buildings in Havre during the 1890s were typical first-generation structures and mainly consisted of tar papered wood-framed shacks.  Built close together, these buildings were false-fronted and one story high, with a few scattered one-and-a-half and two-story buildings, like the Windsor Hotel on the south side of First Street between Third and Fourth Avenues. Along with its annex, the Windsor, at two stories, was the tallest building on First Street until brick structures were constructed in the mid-1890s. Havre had many businesses typical of a frontier town including saloons, barbers, restaurants, Chinese laundries, cobblers, bakeries, mercantiles, hardware stores, and hotels.  Havre was founded primarily to serve as a major railroad service center for the Great Northern Railway built by James J. Hill with the city's location midway between Seattle and Minneapolis-St. Paul. A statue of Hill stands near the Havre Amtrak station to commemorate the key contributions his railroad has made to Havre's and Montana's history. Next to the station on display is Great Northern S-2 Class #2584, a 4-8-4 "Northern" type steam locomotive that served the station while it was in passenger service.

Originally named "Bullhook Bottoms", the town held a series of meetings to determine a new name. The original settlers were given the final decision, and due to a strong French influence, the town was renamed "Havre". To decide on a new name, the town held a meeting. Though that first meeting ended in a brawl, the second meeting was more successful. There, the citizenry agreed that only the original five homesteaders, Gus Decelles, Exor Pepin (nephew of Simon Pepin), Tom McDevitt, Joe Demars and Charlie Goutchie would be allowed to vote. After several suggestions, including "France" to acknowledge their common heritage, Gus Decelles then suggested Havre after his parents’ hometown of Le Havre, France. "Havre", which means "the haven or harbor", won the vote.

Simon Pepin (1840–1914), the "Father of Havre", was born in Quebec and emigrated to Montana in 1863, where he became a contractor, furnishing supplies for the construction of Fort Custer, Fort Assinniboine, and Fort Maginnis. Pepin purchased ranch land near Fort Assinniboine. When James J. Hill built the Great Northern Railway across northern Montana, he built several locomotive shops on property Pepin owned at the site of Havre. Pepin became a major contributor to Havre's economic growth through his cattle, real estate, and banking enterprises.

Havre is the eighth-largest city in Montana, and the largest city in the Montana section of the Hi-Line. U.S. Highway 87 has its northern terminus at Havre. U.S. Highway 2, running east–west, is the city's main street. The largest employers are Northern Montana Hospital, Montana State University–Northern, and the Burlington Northern and Santa Fe Railway. Throughout much of the twentieth century,  was the most prominent employer in the city, but the company scaled back its workforce in Havre in the 1990s. The Milk River (tributary of the Missouri River) runs through the town, and the Bears Paw Mountains can be seen to the south.

Small grids of purple squares can be seen in some of the sidewalks downtown. These are skylights for an underground mall built in the city at least a hundred years ago. Throughout its history, this underground area has been host to a brothel, a Chinese laundromat, a saloon, a drugstore, at least three opium dens, and rooms used for smuggling alcohol during Prohibition. When fire destroyed Havre's business district in 1904, legitimate above-ground businesses joined the illicit businesses operating in the underground while the new brick buildings were built in the streets above. The underground area, now designated "Havre Beneath the Streets", currently operates as a tourist attraction.

The Wahkpa Chu'gn buffalo jump, or bison kill, is located behind the Holiday Village Shopping Center near the northwest corner of Havre. Over 2,000 years old, it is one of the largest and best-preserved buffalo jumps anywhere. In prehistoric times, Native Americans would drive bison over the edge of the cliff, killing or severely injuring the animals. Afterward, the Native Americans skinned the animals and preserved the meat. The buffalo jump is now an archaeological site and a small tourist attraction.

The buffalo jump is located at the southern edge of the Havre Badlands, a badlands formation that runs alongside the Milk River to the west of the city. Small fossils, including seashells and petrified wood, can be found in the limestone sediment in this area.

 southwest of Havre is Fort Assinniboine, which served as one of Montana's principal military posts from 1879 through the Prohibition era. The fort was one of many used by the United States to protect against potential attacks from Native Americans and to block incursions from Canada. At its peak, the fort housed and employed 489 soldiers in 104 buildings.

Also near Havre is the Bear's Paw Battlefield site of the Battle of Bear Paw, where the Nez Perce were attacked and defeated by the U.S. Cavalry. Chief Joseph surrendered to the Cavalry and made a famous speech ending with the line, "From where the sun now stands, I will fight no more forever."

In 2018, two natural-born U.S. citizens were detained by U.S. Customs and Border Protection agents; in 2020, they settled with CBP for an undisclosed sum.

Geography
Havre is located in eastern Hill County at  (48.5454, -109.6775). U.S. Route 2 (1st Street) is the main road through the city, running east to west near the city's northern border. Route 2 leads east  to Malta and west  to Shelby and Interstate 15. US 87 leads southwest  to Great Falls. Montana Secondary Highway 234 leads south from the center of Havre  to the Bear Paw Ski Bowl in the Bears Paw Mountains.

Climate
Havre experiences a semi-arid climate (Köppen BSk) with long, cold, dry winters and hot summers with cool nights.

Demographics

2010 census
As of the census of 2010, there were 9,310 people, 3,900 households, and 2,293 families living in the city. The racial makeup of the city was 81.6% White, 0.4% African American, 13.0% Native American, 0.6% Asian, 0.1% Pacific Islander, 0.3% from other races, and 4.0% from two or more races. Hispanic or Latino of any race were 2.5% of the population.

There were 3,900 households, of which 30.1% had children under the age of 18 living with them, 41.3% were married couples living together, 12.1% had a female householder with no husband present, 5.5% had a male householder with no wife present, and 41.2% were non-families. 33.8% of all households were made up of individuals, and 12% had someone living alone who was 65 years of age or older. The average household size was 2.30 and the average family size was 2.98.

The median age in the city was 33.9 years. 25.1% of residents were under the age of 18; 12.8% were between the ages of 18 and 24; 23.5% were from 25 to 44; 25.2% were from 45 to 64; and 13.4% were 65 years of age or older. The gender makeup of the city was 49.8% male and 50.2% female.

2000 census
As of the census of 2000, there were 9,621 people, 4,015 households, and 2,449 families living in the city. The population density was 2,778.2 people per square mile (1,073.6/km2). There were 4,400 housing units at an average density of 1,270.6 per square mile (491.0/km2). The racial makeup of the city was 87.08% White, 0.11% African American, 9.01% Native American, 0.49% Asian, 0.02% Pacific Islander, 0.51% from other races, and 2.78% from two or more races. Hispanic or Latino of any race were 1.48% of the population.

There were 4,015 households, out of which 31.9% had children under the age of 18 living with them, 45.2% were married couples living together, 11.5% had a female householder with no husband present, and 39.0% were non-families. 32.6% of all households were made up of individuals, and 13.2% had someone living alone who was 65 years of age or older. The average household size was 2.32 and the average family size was 2.95.

In the city, the population was spread out, with 25.7% under the age of 18, 13.6% from 18 to 24, 25.4% from 25 to 44, 20.6% from 45 to 64, and 14.6% who were 65 years of age or older. The median age was 34 years. For every 100 females there were 96.8 males. For every 100 females age 18 and over, there were 92.3 males.

The median income for a household in the city was $29,944, and the median income for a family was $38,870. Males had a median income of $30,401 versus $19,189 for females. The per capita income for the city was $15,847. About 14.8% of families and 17.5% of the population were below the poverty line, including 22.0% of those under age 18 and 7.8% of those age 65 or over.

Transportation
Havre is located on the Northern Transcon of the BNSF Railway; Amtrak's Empire Builder stops at Havre station daily. North Central Montana Transit provides limited bus service to Great Falls, Montana, the Rocky Boy's Indian Reservation, Harlem, Montana, and Fort Belknap, Montana.

Local media

Radio
 KOJM AM 610/FM 98.3 (Oldies)
 KNMC FM 90.1 (College Radio)
 KPQX FM 92.5 (Country)
 KXEI FM 95.1 (Christian)
 KRYK FM 101.3 (Adult contemporary)

Television
Stations available from the Great Falls market:
 KRTV Ch. 3 (CBS)
 KTGF-LD Ch. 50 (NBC)
 KUGF-TV Ch. 21 (PBS)
 KFBB Ch. 5 (ABC)

Satellite television providers are available to the entire area, and cable service comes from Charter Cable.

Newspapers
The Havre Daily News is regionally available. Its circulation is 3,500 papers daily, published Monday through Friday. It has a full online edition by subscription, as well as some free content online. The larger Great Falls Tribune is also available in most areas. The Havre Herald was a free online site for local news (closed mid-2020).

Education
The city is served by Havre Public Schools, which operates Havre High School, S.U.N.S. Alternative High School, Havre Middle School, and three elementary schools.

Higher education is provided at the Montana State University-Northern campus.

Havre has a public library, the Havre-Hill County Library.

The city hosts one private school within city limits, Saint Judes Thaddeus School; it is affiliated with the Catholic Church.

Points of interest
 LORAN-C transmitter Havre
 Big Bud 747, the world's largest farm tractor
 Too Close for Comfort Site, a buffalo jump archaeological site, open to visitors
 Havre also hosts historic bars, namely the Oxford Sports Bar and The Palace.
 The Havre Underground, a tourist attraction that takes you to the historic under city, is a local favourite.

Notable people

 Philip Aaberg, pianist and composer
 John Ahern, Washington state legislator and businessman
 Jeff Ament, musician, Pearl Jam's bassist
 Karan Armstrong, opera singer
 Harriet Bossnot, social and civic worker
 T.V. Buttrey, academic and numismatist
 Ryan Divish, journalist for the Seattle Times
 Jeff Doyle, Major League Baseball player
 William Hulett, actor in Cirque du Soleil, Zumanity
 Marc Mariani, former NFL football player
 Larry Maze, bishop of the Episcopal Diocese of Arkansas, 1994–2006
 Jill McLain, Miss Montana USA 2006
 Karl Ohs, former lieutenant governor of Montana
 Flint Rasmussen, professional rodeo clown
 Rob Ryan, Major League Baseball player
 Rick Rydell, radio talk show host and outdoors author
 Brian Schweitzer, governor of Montana 2005–2013
 Stan Stephens, governor of Montana 1989–1993
 Jon Tester, incumbent U.S. senator
 Mike Tilleman, former NFL football player
 Jacob Bachmeier, one of the youngest state legislators in the United States

See also
 Fort Assinniboine
 Havre station
 Montana State University–Northern
 Rocky Boy Indian Reservation

References

External links

 
 Havre Chamber of Commerce
 History of Havre on the Web
 Wahkpa Chu'gn Bison Kill
 Montana State University Northern
 State of Montana's Havre Profile

1893 establishments in Montana
Cities in Hill County, Montana
County seats in Montana
Populated places established in 1893
Cities in Montana